Magnus Alexander Maximilian Freiherr von Braun (7 February 1878 – 29 August 1972) was a German civil servant and politician (DNVP) whose career spanned the German Empire, World War I and the Weimar Republic. He served as the Federal Minister of Nutrition and Agriculture from 1 June 1932 to 28 January 1933.

He was the father of pioneering rocket scientist Wernher von Braun.

Biography
Magnus von Braun was born at his family's manor of Neucken, an estate the von Brauns had owned since 1803, near Pr. Eylau (present-day Dubki near Bagrationovsk, Russia) in East Prussia to Maximilian von Braun (1833–1918) and Eleonore (née von Gostkowski) (1842–1928).

He studied law at the universities of Göttingen and Königsberg and joined the Prussian civil service in 1905, at first at the Department of Trade and Commerce in Berlin. With his father's death in 1918, he inherited the title of Freiherr (equivalent to Baron and translated as such in English).

Between 1911 and 1915 he was the district chief executive (Landrat) of the Kreis Wirsitz (Province of Posen). He returned to Berlin in 1915 after being given an office with the Department of the Interior.

In September 1917 Braun became the first chief press officer for the Reich Chancellery and later the head of the political department of the military administration of Vilnius.

He became the Stadthauptmann (head of the administration) for the Baltic town of Daugavpils in 1918. Following the conclusion of World War I, Braun was appointed Commissarial Police President of Stettin (now Szczecin, Poland) in 1919. Braun then worked again at the Department of Interior and became the President of the Governorate of Gumbinnen.

He was dismissed from the civil service after the Kapp Putsch in 1920 for his role in the coup.

Braun returned to his family's manor in East Prussia and was active in several agricultural organisations like the Raiffeisen cooperative.

In 1930 he became the Vice President of the Reichsverband der Landwirtschaftlichen Genossenschaften (Association of Agricultural Cooperatives).

On 1 June 1932 he was appointed Weimar Germany's Minister of Nutrition and Agriculture and Reichskommissar for Eastern Aid (Osthilfe) in the cabinet of Chancellor Franz von Papen, a position he kept under Chancellor Kurt von Schleicher until 28 January 1933.

After the Nazis came to power on 30 January 1933, Braun moved to his manor in Silesia, which after World War II became part of  Poland and Braun was expelled to Western Germany in 1946.

Braun followed his son Wernher to the United States in 1947, but returned to Germany in 1952, where he died in 1972 at Oberaudorf.

Braun married Emmy von Quistorp (1886–1959) on 12 July 1910. They had three sons: 
 Sigismund von Braun (1911–1998), diplomat
 Wernher von Braun (1912–1977), rocket scientist
 Magnus von Braun (1919–2003), industrial manager

References

External links 

Genealogy wiki

1878 births
1972 deaths
People from Kaliningrad Oblast
People from the Province of Prussia
Barons of Germany
German National People's Party politicians
Government ministers of Germany
Prussian politicians
University of Göttingen alumni
University of Königsberg alumni
Wernher von Braun